Telorchis is a genus of trematode parasites found in many herps, comprising around 70 species. This parasite is an indirect parasite, with a snail intermediate host and a reptile or amphibian definitive host. Typically found in the gastrointestinal tract of their definitive host, telorchids attach to the wall of the intestinal tract with their ventral sucker, or acetabulum.

Morphology 
Description of Telorchis from Wharton 1940: "Elongate, flat distomes with simple oral suckers. Oral and ventral suckers subequal. Pharynx present. Intestinal crura begin preacetabular and end near the posterior end of the body. Vitellaria lateral. Genital pore just anterior to the ventral sucker, usually somewhat to the left of the median line. Cirrus sac extends behind the acetabulum. Ovary posterior to or at the posterior level of cirrus sac. Uterus with descending and ascending coils, does not extend behind the testes. Metraterm anterior to ovary and usually about half as long as cirrus sac. Laurer's canal present. Testes in tandem at the posterior end."

Species

References 

Parasites of reptiles
Digenea genera